The Principality of Abkhazia emerged as a separate feudal entity in the 15th-16th centuries, amid the civil wars in the Kingdom of Georgia that concluded with the dissolution of the unified Georgian monarchy. The principality retained a degree of autonomy under the Ottoman, and then the Russian rule, but was eventually absorbed into the Russian Empire in 1864.

Background
Abkhazia, as a duchy (saeristavo) within the Kingdom of Georgia, was previously referred as the Duchy of Tskhumi was ruled by the clan of Shervashidze (aka Sharvashidze, Chachba, or Sharashia) since the 12th century. The sources are very scarce about the Abkhazian history of that time. The Genoese established their trading factories along the Abkhazian coastline in the 14th century, but they functioned for a short time. When the Georgian kingdom was embroiled in a bitter civil war in the 1450s, the Shervashidzes joined a major rebellion against King George VIII of Georgia, which saw him defeated at the hands of the rebels at Chikhori in 1463. As a result, Georgia split into three rival kingdoms and five principalities. The Abkhazian princes were the vassals of the Principality of Mingrelia under the dynasty of Dadiani(-Bediani), which, in turn, was subordinated to the Kingdom of Imereti. The vassalage was, however, largely nominal, and both Mingrelian and Abkhazian rulers not only successfully fought for their independence, but contested borders with each other and with Imereti. The independence of Abkhazia was largely symbolic as the region was generally left alone as the kings of Imereti had their hands full governing their designated area. In 1490, the split became official as Georgia was split by treaty into the Kingdom of Kartli, Imereti, of which Abkhazia was a part, Kakheti and Principality of Samtskhe.

The 16th-18th centuries
In the 1570s, the Ottoman navy occupied the fort of Tskhumi, turning it into the Turkish fortress of Suhum-Kale. Abkhazia came under the influence of Turkey and Islam, although Christianity was but slowly replaced and it was not until the second half of the 18th century that the ruling Shervashidze family embraced Islam. Until then, Abkhazia, secured from large-scale invasions by its mountainous location and impassable forests, had retained independence and profited from commerce in traditional Caucasian commodities, that of slaves not excepted.

Throughout the 16th–18th centuries, the Abkhazian lords were involved in the incessant border conflicts with the Mingrelian princes. As a result, the Shervashidze potentates were able to expand their possessions in the east, first to the river Ghalidzga, and then to the Inguri, which serves as today's boundary between Abkhazia and Georgia proper. After the death of the Abkhazian prince Zegnak circa 1700, his principality was divided among his sons. The oldest brother Rostom established himself as a prince of Abkhazia proper, also known as the Bzyb Abkhazia, on the coast from the modern-day Gagra on the Bzyb River to the Ghalidzga river, with the residence in the village of Lykhny; Jikeshia received Abjua between the Ghalidzga and the Kodori; and Kvapu became a lord of a county on the coast extending from the Ghalidzga to the Inguri, subsequently known as the country of Samurzakan’o after Kvapu's son Murzakan. The highlands of Dal-Tzabal (Tzebelda, Tsabal) were without any centralized government, but were dominated by the clan of Marshan. Sadzny, formerly known as Zygia (Jiketi of the Georgian sources) extended north to Abkhazia proper between the modern-day cities of Gagra and Sochi, and was run by Gechba, Arydba and Tsanba clans. These polities included also several minor fiefdoms governed by the representatives of the Shervashidze-Chachba house or other noble families such as Achba (Anchabadze), Emhaa (Emukhvari), Ziapsh-Ipa, Inal-Ipa, Chabalurkhua and Chkhotua. All these princedoms were more or less dependent on the princes of Abkhazia proper.

Between the Ottoman and Russian empires
Keilash Bey seems to have been the first presiding prince of Abkhazia (circa 1780-1808) to embrace Islam, and was given, on this account, the fort of Suhum-Kale. These conversions of the Abkhazian princes were, however, not irreversible; during the 19th century, various Shervashidzes shifted back and forth across the religious divide, as the Russians and Ottomans struggled for control of the region. The first attempt to enter into relation with Russia was made by the said Keilash Bey in 1803, shortly after the incorporation of eastern Georgia into the expanding Tsarist empire (1801). After the assassination of this prince by his son Aslan-Bey on May 2, 1808, the pro-Ottoman orientation prevailed but for a short time. On July 2, 1810, the Russian Marines stormed Suhum-Kale and had Aslan-Bey replaced with his rival brother, Sefer-Bey (1810–1821), who had converted to Christianity and assumed the name of George. Abkhazia joined the Russian empire as an autonomous principality.

However, George's rule, as well of his successors, was limited to the neighbourhood of Suhum-Kale and the Bzyb area garrisoned by the Russians while the other parts had remained under the rule of the Muslim nobles. The next Russo-Turkish war strongly enhanced the Russian positions, leading to a further split in the Abkhaz elite, mainly along religious divisions. During the Crimean War (1853–1856), Russian forces had to evacuate Abkhazia and Prince Michael (1822–1864) seemingly switched to the Ottomans. Later on, the Russian presence strengthened and the highlanders of Western Caucasia were finally subjugated by Russia in 1864. The autonomy of Abkhazia, which had functioned as a pro-Russian "buffer zone" in this troublesome region, was no more needed to the Tsarist government and the rule of the Shervashidze came to an end; in November 1864, Prince Michael was forced to renounce his rights and resettle in Voronezh. Abkhazia was incorporated in the Russian Empire as a special military province of Suhum-Kale which was transformed, in 1883, into an okrug as part of the Kutais Guberniya.

Lykhny revolt
In July 1866 an attempt made by the Russian authorities to collect information concerning the economic conditions of the Abkhaz, for the purpose of taxation, led to the Lykhny revolt. The rebels proclaimed Michael Shervashidze's son George as prince and marched on Sukhumi. Only the strong Russian reinforcements led by General Dmitry Ivanovich Svyatopolk-Mirsky were able to suppress the revolt by the same August. The harsh Russian reaction led, subsequently, to a considerable emigration of the Abkhaz muhajirs to the Ottoman Empire, especially after the locals took part in the rebellion of the Caucasian mountaineers incited by the landing of Turkish troops in 1877. As a result, many areas became virtually deserted and the population of Abkhazia was reduced threefold.

Rulers

See also
Abkhazian Kingdom
Caucasian War
History of Georgia
Russian Empire

Footnotes

References

Further reading
 

Principality of Abkhazia
Former monarchies of Europe
Early Modern history of Georgia (country)
Former principalities of Georgia (country)
Russian Empire
States and territories established in the 1460s
States and territories disestablished in 1864
House of Shervashidze
Vassal states of the Ottoman Empire